Kupferstichkabinett is the German word for print room.  It may also refer to:

Kupferstichkabinett Berlin
Kupferstich-Kabinett (Dresden)